The SIIMA Award for Best Film – Malayalam is an award, begun in 2012, presented annually at the South Indian International Movie Awards to a film and production house via viewers and the winner is announced at the ceremony. The nominations for the category are given by the jury members.

Winners and nominees

2010s

2020s

Notes

References 

South Indian International Movie Awards